Bellair is an unincorporated community in Cooper County, Missouri, United States. The community is on Missouri Route 5, approximately ten miles south-southwest of Boonville.

History
Bellair was founded in the 1840s by T. P. Airbell, and named for him. A post office called Bellair was established in 1849, then was changed to Bell Air in 1864, and the post office closed in 1906.

References

Unincorporated communities in Cooper County, Missouri